Noam Jacobson (born 1975) is a musician, singer, songwriter, and bandleader from Ramat Gan, Israel.

Jacobson is a regular on the Israeli satirical television program Latma where he plays such characters as Tawil Fadiha, the “Palestinian Minister of Uncontrollable Rage,” and Rashid Hamumani, "Iranian minister of destruction."  He is also known for playing "Captain Stabbing" in the satirical video We Con the World.

In September 2016, "STAYIN’ ALIVE" - an Israeli Satire-Comedy Show starring Jacobson and Gady Weissbart - started a world tour.

References

1975 births
21st-century Israeli male singers
Living people
People from Petah Tikva